The 2014–15 Eastern Illinois Panthers men's basketball team represented Eastern Illinois University during the 2014–15 NCAA Division I men's basketball season. The Panthers, led by third year head coach Jay Spoonhour, played their home games at Lantz Arena and were members of the West Division of the Ohio Valley Conference. They finished the season 18–15, 9–7 in OVC play to finish in third place in the West Division. They advanced to the quarterfinals of the OVC tournament where they lost to Belmont. They were invited to the CollegeInsider.com Tournament where they defeated Oakland in the first round before losing in the second round to Evansville.

Roster

Schedule

|-
!colspan=9 style=| Exhibition

|-
!colspan=9 style=| Regular season

|-
!colspan=9 style=|Ohio Valley tournament

|-
!colspan=9 style=|CollegeInsider.com tournament

References

Eastern Illinois Panthers men's basketball seasons
Eastern Illinois
Eastern Illinois